Martigny-Croix railway station is a railway station in the municipality of Martigny, in the Swiss canton of Valais. It is located on the standard gauge Martigny–Orsières line of Transports de Martigny et Régions.

Services 
 the following services stop at Martigny-Croix:

References

External links 
 
 

Railway stations in the canton of Valais
Transports de Martigny et Régions stations